The ashy myzomela (Myzomela cineracea) is a species of bird in the family Meliphagidae. It is found in New Britain and Umboi Island in Papua New Guinea. It was previously considered a subspecies of the ruby-throated myzomela.

References

ashy myzomela
Birds of New Britain
ashy myzomela
Taxa named by Philip Sclater